Jeffrey Ross Lifschultz (born 1965) is an American stand-up comedian and actor.

Jeffrey Ross may also refer to:

 Jeffrey Ross Gunter, American dermatologist and diplomat
 Jeffrey Ross Toobin (born 1960), American lawyer and author